New California may also refer to:

 Alta California, a 19th-century Spanish and later Mexican territory officially known as Nueva California between 1804 and 1824
 A 21st-century proposal for partition and secession in California
 New California, Ohio, a census-designated place
 Garden City, Texas, formerly known as New California
 New California Republic, a fictional federal republic and faction featured in Fallout (series)